Gaoling Town is a town located in the Miyun District of Beijing, China. Situated niorth of Miyun Reservoir, it shares border with Bakeshiying Town to its north, Gubeikou Town to its northeast, Taishitun Town to its southeast, and Bulaotun Town to its west. The population of Gaoling was 9,967 as of 2020.

The name Gaoling can be translated as "Tall Mountain", and is referring to Gaoling Village, where the town's government is located in.

History

Administrative divisions 
By the end of 2021, these 23 subdivisions constituted Gaoling Town:

Transportation 
The town is primarily connected to the outside through Beijing–Tongliao railway and Liuxin Road.

Gallery

See also 
 List of township-level divisions of Beijing

References

Miyun District
Towns in Beijing